Rock Island Creek is a creek in Douglas County, Washington. It rises in Douglas County, flows past Badger Mountain, and its mouth is near Rock Island Dam on the Columbia River.

References

Rivers of Douglas County, Washington